The Fan Appreciation 200 was a 200 lap NASCAR Camping World Truck Series race held at Iowa Speedway in Newton, Iowa. The second race held at Iowa Speedway, it originally shared a name and title sponsor with its sister race, the American Ethanol 200, in Newton. Ryan Blaney, son of Cup driver Dave Blaney won the inaugural race by holding off Ty Dillon. Blaney's win at the age of 18 years, 8 months, and 15 days made him the youngest winner in Camping World Truck Series history at the time. The race was removed from the schedule after the 2013 season.

Past winners

2013: Race extended because of two green–white–checker finish attempts.

Manufacturer wins

References

External links
 

Former NASCAR races
NASCAR Truck Series races
 
2012 establishments in Iowa
2013 disestablishments in Iowa
Recurring sporting events established in 2012
Recurring sporting events disestablished in 2013